Peter Hellenbrand (born 7 December 1985, Brunssum) is a Dutch sport shooter. 

Hellenbrand competed at the 2012 Summer Olympics in the Men's 10 metre air rifle, which is his strongest area in the sport, where he finished fifth.  He also competed in the men's 50 metre rifle prone and men's 50 metre rifle - 3 positions events, finishing in 43rd and 28th respectively.

References

1985 births
Living people
Dutch male sport shooters
Olympic shooters of the Netherlands
Shooters at the 2012 Summer Olympics
People from Brunssum
European Games competitors for the Netherlands
Shooters at the 2015 European Games
Shooters at the 2019 European Games
Sportspeople from Limburg (Netherlands)
21st-century Dutch people